ICC Thang Long Global Center, also known as Shenglong Global Center is a supertall skyscraper in Fuzhou, Fujian, China. Construction started in 2012 and was completed in 2019.

References

Buildings and structures in Fuzhou
Buildings and structures under construction in China
Skyscrapers in Fujian
Skyscraper office buildings in China